Alberton High School is a high school located in Alberton, Montana and is part of Alberton K-12 Schools. In the 2006–2007 school year, there were 80 students enrolled. In the 2012–2013 school year, there were 45 students enrolled. There is a grade school sharing the campus that currently enrolls 108 students.

Notes

Public high schools in Montana
Schools in Mineral County, Montana